Liam Anthony Kelly (born 22 November 1995) is a professional footballer who plays as a midfielder for EFL League Two club Rochdale. Born in England, he has represented the Republic of Ireland internationally at youth levels U19 and U21.

Club career

Reading
In November 2013, Kelly signed his first professional contract with Reading, In May 2016, Kelly signed a two-year contract with Reading.
On 12 February 2016, Kelly joined Bath City on an initial one-month loan, extending it for another month on 11 March, before extending it till the end of the season 10 April 2016.
Kelly made his debut for Reading on 23 August 2016 at home to Milton Keynes Dons in the EFL Cup, coming on for George Evans, with his league debut coming on 22 October 2016 away to Rotherham United.

On 30 December, Kelly signed a new contract, keeping him at the Reading until the summer of 2019.

He scored his first goal for Reading in a 3–2 win against Bristol City on 2 January 2017.

Kelly extended his Reading contract on 6 July 2017, signing a new three-year deal.

Feyenoord
On 8 July 2019, Kelly signed for Feyenoord on a three-year contract for an undisclosed fee.

Oxford United signed Kelly on a loan deal until the end of the 2019–20 season on 8 January 2020. On 21 August 2020, Kelly's loan at the club was extended for another season.

Rochdale
On 24 August 2021, Kelly signed a two-year contract with Rochdale.

International career

Kelly made his Republic of Ireland under-19 debut against Slovenia under-19 in September 2013. Whilst playing for the Republic of Ireland U19's against Sweden under-19, Kelly scored a wonder goal from the halfway line.
Kelly made his Republic of Ireland under-21 debut against United States under-20 in November 2014.

Kelly received his first call up for the Republic of Ireland on 13 March 2017, being named in the 39-man provisional squad for the games against Wales and Iceland.

Kelly rejected a call-up to the Republic of Ireland senior squad in March 2018, for personal reasons.

Career statistics

Club

Notes

References

External links

1995 births
Living people
Republic of Ireland association footballers
Republic of Ireland youth international footballers
Republic of Ireland under-21 international footballers
English footballers
English people of Irish descent
Association football midfielders
Reading F.C. players
Bath City F.C. players
English Football League players
National League (English football) players
Feyenoord players
Oxford United F.C. players
Rochdale A.F.C. players